Gowri MN (born 30 August 1989) is an Indian sand artist from Mysore, Karnataka who has been working with sand for over seven years. She is the only female sand sculpture artist in India.

Early life and background
Gowri has an MFA in sculpture from Karnataka State Open University. She has a diploma in machine tool technology, but discontinued engineering to pursue a career in sand sculpting.

Career
Gowri created a sand museum using 115 truckloads of construction sand (river sand). About 150 sculptures have been created on 16 themes, including religion, astrology, and mythology, at the 13,500 sq ft museum.

References

1989 births
Living people
Sand art